Mangwal is a village and union council, an administrative subdivision, of Chakwal District in the Punjab Province of Pakistan, it is part of Chakwal Tehsil and is located at 33°6'30N 72°49'32E.

History
At the time of British India - Mangwal was part of Chakwal tehsil and Chakwal was an important tehsil of Jhelum district. While, rest of the residents of other tehsils were referred as Jhelumi or jhelumis - Residents of Chakwal were particularly called Chakwalias. Aboriginals of Mangwal belonged to the ferocious Mughal Kassar tribe 
Great Mughal prince Sardar Mango Khan s/o Sardar Lakhan Khan suggested the name Mangowal, means a place where descendents of Mango khan live. 
Mangwal was well-known for Mangwal market and people from Attock, outskirts of Chakwal and jhelum came to Mangwal to trade goods and necessities. 
People of Mangwal are well-to-do since then. Looking at the History the famous fight b/w Sardar Khan Nawab and 7 chiefs of different tribes was the most tragic fight and is remembered till date.

References

Union councils of Chakwal District
Populated places in Chakwal District